Valentín Paz Andrade (b. Pontevedra, 23 April 1898 – Vigo, 19 May 1987) was a Galician lawyer, writer, politician, journalist, poet, businessman and economist.

Galician Literature Day is dedicated to him in 2012.

Works

Pranto matricial (1955) .
Los derechos sobre el espacio marítimo (1960) .
La anunciación de Valle-Inclán (1967) .
Sementeira do vento (1968) .
La marginacíón de Galicia (1970) .
X. R. Barreiro Fernández, F. Díaz-Fierros ..., Los Gallegos, (1976), La sociedad y la economía, (1975), pp. 45–93.
A galecidade na obra de Guimarães Rosa (1978) .
Cen chaves de sombra (1979) .
Castelao na luz e na sombra (1982) .
Galiza lavra a sua imagem (1985) .
O legado xornalístico de Valentín Paz-Andrade (1997) .
Epistolario, (1997) .

References

Further information
Freixanes, Víctor F. (1982), Unha ducia de galegos. .
Calvo, Tucho (1998), Valentín Paz-Andrade, a memoria do século. .
Portela Yáñez, Charo (1999), Valentín Paz-Andrade. Escritor, xornalista e poeta. Avogado, político e empresario. .
Rodríguez Vidales, Francisco (1999), VPA, Valentín Paz-Andrade. .

External links 

 Official website
 Enciclopedia Galega Universal

People from Pontevedra
Galician poets
Galician journalists
20th-century Spanish lawyers
Politicians from Galicia (Spain)
Businesspeople from Galicia (Spain)
Spanish economists
1898 births
1987 deaths
Food and Agriculture Organization officials
Galician-language writers
20th-century Spanish poets
20th-century Spanish male writers
Spanish officials of the United Nations